Oliva polpasta is a species of sea snail, a marine gastropod mollusc in the family Olividae, the olives.

Subspecies
 Oliva polpasta polpasta Duclos, 1833
 Oliva polpasta radix Petuch & Sargent, 1986

Description
The length of the shell varies between 19 mm and 50 mm.

Distribution
This marine species occurs off the Gulf of California to Peru.

References

 Vervaet F.L.J. (2018). The living Olividae species as described by Pierre-Louis Duclos. Vita Malacologica. 17: 1–111

External links
 Duclos P.L. (1833). Olive polpasta. Oliva polpasta. Magasin de Zoologie. 3(5): pl. 20
 Duclos, P. L. (1835–1840). Histoire naturelle générale et particulière de tous les genres de coquilles univalves marines a l'état vivant et fossile publiée par monographie. Genre Olive. Paris: Institut de France. 33 plates: pls 1–pls 1 [1835], pls 13–pls 13
 Syntype at MNHN, Paris

polpasta